Escape from Scorpion Island is a Bafta nominated BBC children's TV adventure game show in which contestants compete to 'escape from an exotic island'. Series 1 was produced by RDF Television. The first premiered on 3 September 2007 on BBC One and was presented by Caroline Flack and Reggie Yates. It was filmed in Fernando de Noronha, Brazil.

Synopsis
The adventurers arrive on Scorpion Island and are divided into teams, known as Sting and Claw. Each team consists of five members each for a total of ten adventurers. Over the following three weeks the teams are required to complete various challenges in order to gain various advantages throughout the game, such as extra time.

The final objective is to be the first team to escape from the island. During the second week the teams collect Powerplayers for headstarts in the final challenge to escape from the island. On the third week contestants have to use their Powerplayers to gain time advantages. In season 1 the scores were Claw on 3 and Sting on 1. The final challenge was Shadow Mountain Highway. Claw got a 2-minute headstart and eventually won, since Sting's Kyran and Oscar received minor injuries while climbing.

Series 1 also aired in Canada in January 2009 and was broadcast on YTV (TV channel).

Contestants
Team Claw (Rock Camp 5 members)

Barbara  (First member of Secret Camp)
Helen  (Original member of Team Sting.)
James (Third member of Secret Camp)
Ayesha Freedman, 12 (Fourth member of Secret Camp.)
Sam  (Original member of Team Sting.)

Team Sting (Tree Camp 5 members)

Haley (Second member of Secret Camp. Original member of Team Claw.)
Kyran  (Fifth member of Secret Camp. Original member of Team Claw.)
Lianna Hoppe, 14
Joe
Oscar Samant-Laidlaw, 14

The two island stunt kids were Nikhil Aggarwal and Elizabeth Hawthorne.

Secret Camp was a camp during the first week in which competitors were prevented from returning to Beach Camp. Caroline specifically indicated that the team was not eliminated from the competition, they just weren't returning to Beach Camp, as they built Claw.

Haley and Kyran (Claw) and Helen and Sam (Sting) swapped teams on day 12 in Reverse Bungees.

Powerplays 
Mystery - Turned out to swap the teams finishing times. This was won by Claw in Double Trouble, used in Landslide.
Swap - Used to swap what may be a strong opposing team for a weaker one. Won by Sting in Landing on Water
Out of Reach - Made the challenge tougher for the opposition. Won by Claw in Colourfall.
Repeat - Allows the user to replay the challenge if they lose. Won by Claw in Bike Lane, used in Canopy Crawl.
Take away - Allows the user to reduce the challenge time. Won by Claw in Stacked, used in A Bridge Too Far.

Episodes

Day 1
Arrival - Drop Off
Island Challenge - Fire Walk
Beach Camp - Ayesha, Haley, Helen, James, Joe, Kyran, Lianna, Oscar and Sam.
Secret Camp - Barbara

Day 2
Camp Challenge -
Island Challenge - Abandon Ship!. James and Sam vs Ayesha and Haley.
Beach Camp - Ayesha, Helen, James, Joe, Kyran, Lianna, Oscar and Sam.
Secret Camp - Barbara and Haley

Day 3
Camp Challenge - Whale Of A Time!. Oscar, Helen, Lianna and Ayesha. (Fail)
Island Challenge - Sea Slalom!. James and Joe vs *Oscar and Sam. (Kyran was taken ill so Oscar took his place)
Beach Camp - Ayesha, Helen, Joe, Kyran, Lianna, Oscar and Sam.
Secret Camp - Barbara, Haley and James

Day 4
Camp Challenge - Load Aim Fire!. Sam, Kyran and Oscar. (Fail)
Island Challenge - Rock n Roll!. Lianna and Joe vs Helen and Ayesha.
Beach Camp - Helen, Joe, Kyran, Lianna, Oscar and Sam.
Secret Camp - Barbara, Haley, James and Ayesha.

Day 5
Camp Challenge - Stuck In The Mud!. Joe, Lianna, Oscar and Sam. (Pass)
Island Challenge - Para Shoot!. Kyran vs Helen.
Beach Camp - Helen, Joe, Lianna, Oscar and Sam.
Secret Camp - Barbara, Haley, James, Ayesha and Kyran.

Day 6
Camp Challenge - 
Island Challenge - 
Beach Camp - 
Secret Camp -

Challenges
Drop Off - The ten must abseil out of a helicopter as it hovers more than 30 metres above unknown waters and swim to a waiting pontoon.
Fire Walk - All ten contestants must walk across hot coals. After this, the island called for Barbara to go to Claw
Abandon Ship! - A mysterious ship has drifted into the bay - the four challengers must scale the ship’s mighty 30 - metre masts as it sways in the rough waters off Scorpion Island. James/Sam vs Ayesha and Haley Sent Haley to Claw
Sea Slalom - The four challengers are dragged through the treacherous waters off Scorpion Island while trying to grab targets. James/Sam vs Joe/Oscar. Sent James to Claw
Rock n' Roll - Working in teams of two, the challengers propel from a cliff face whilst trying connect ropes to pegs in the cliff to create a puzzle shaped like a scorpion. Ayesha vs Joe/Lianna. Sent Ayesha to Claw
Para Shoot - Challengers went para sailing whilst trying to shoot balls at floating targets in the water. Kyran vs Haley. Sent Kyran to Claw
Double Trouble - Two people from each team walk on a zip line while trying to connect ends of their team colored flag to the zip line. Claw won this challenge.
Landing on Water - Two people from each team search for glow sticks inside a half sunken plane wreck. Sting won this challenge.
Colourfall - Three people from each team must collect team coloured balls  as they climb against a torrent of white water up a raging waterfall. Claw won this challenge.
Bike Lane - Two people from each team go one at a time trying to bike across an extremely thin lane 20 metres above one of Scorpion Island's deepest gorges. Claw won this challenge.
Stacked - Teams race head to head to build enormous totem poles, one person on a rope staking the pieces of the pole and the others pulling other ropes to move him/her around.
Reverse Bungees - All of both teams are attached to bungees.  Two of each team, are raised up. *Note: This isn't necessarily a challenge, it was the way of swapping two players of each team to the other team. For more, see above (Contestants).
A Bridge Too Far - Two people from each team on at a time attempt to cross a rickety bridge which is missing huge parts and falls down on one side quite often. Sting won this at first, but Claw used their 'take away' powerplay, and took away some of their time and therefore won.
Landslide! - Two people from each team race up a raging mudslide, with mud, steam, smoke and huge boulders in their way.  Crashing into each other each time one person falls. Sting won this at first, but Claw used their 'mystery' powerplay, swapping the two teams' times and therefore won.
Canopy Crawl - One person from each team will race head-to-head crawling across a zip-line. Sting won at first, but Claw used their powerplay 'repeat' and on the second time, Claw won. This was, arguably, inevitable, as Sting's Joe had to win the first time to keep himself in the game: at this point Claw's Ayesha could choose not to deploy Repeat if she won first time. Having hardly tried the first time, Ayesha flew across, trouncing an exhausted Joe.
Highway/Shadow Mountain - To win the teams must traverse the valley below the mountain on wires 20 metres above the forest floor. The teams must climb the 1500 metre mountain tied together while planting their flags as they go, the first team to summit and raise their final flag will escape and win. Claw won this as they had a huge time advantage and Kyran had breathing problems and Oscar hurt himself on the other team. Claw were awarded with a trip to another tropical island where Caroline and Reggie were waiting with smoothies and mobile-phones so they could call their family before they started the long journey home.

Controversy
Bullying Incident
Season 1 of Scorpion Island started with two less contestants than expected. Unconfirmed Reports suggest that this was due to one contestant's attempts to ostracise another from the group. Both contestants left the group before filming commenced, despite the producers attempts to reconcile the situation. To date this is the only known case of a child being blacklisted from any future CBBC productions.

References

2007 British television seasons